The II International Chopin Piano Competition was held from 6 to 23 March 1932 in Warsaw. Popular with the public, it attracted correspondents from all over the world, not least because of the high-profile composition of the competition jury. Soviet pianist Alexander Uninsky was awarded the first prize, after winning a coin toss against Imre Ungár, who was awarded second place.

Guest of honor was Maurice Ravel, who performed his Piano Concerto in G major and La valse during a concert on 11 March.

Awards 

Out of 67 pianists in the elimination stage, 14 were admitted to the final, where they performed two consecutive movements of one of Chopin's two piano concertos with the Warsaw Philharmonic. Alexander Uninsky was originally awarded joint first prize with blind pianist Imre Ungár, though lots were drawn after the latter refused to accept a joint prize.

The following prizes were awarded:

One special prize was awarded:

Jury 
The jury consisted of:
   (substitute)
  Marian Dąbrowski (substitute)
  Zbigniew Drzewiecki
  Arthur De Greef
  Alfred Hoehn
   (substitute)
  Juliusz Kaden-Bandrowski
  Marguerite Long
  Joseph Marx
   (secretary)
   (vice-chairman)
  
  Maurice Ravel (guest of honor)
  Richard Rössler
  Karol Szymanowski
  
  Józef Turczyński
  Paul Weingarten
   (chairman)
  Carlo Zecchi
  Jerzy Żurawlew

References

Further reading

External links 
 
 

 

International Chopin Piano Competition
1932 in music
1932 in Poland
1930s in Warsaw